Voth is a surname. Notable people with the surname include:

Austin Voth, American baseball player
Brad Voth, Canadian ice hockey player
Christopher Voth (born 1990), Canadian volleyball player
Henry Voth (1855–1931), American Mennonite missionary and ethnographer
Julia Voth (born 1985), Canadian actress and model

Fictional characters
Voth, a fictional race in Star Trek, see Distant Origin
Irma Voth, title character of Miriam Toews's novel Irma Voth

Russian Mennonite surnames